The 1982–83 Alpha Ethniki was the 47th season of the highest football league of Greece. The season began on 19 September 1982 and ended on 26 June 1983. Olympiacos won their fourth consecutive and 24th Greek title.

The point system was: Win: 2 points - Draw: 1 point.

League table

Results

Top scorers

External links
Official Greek FA Site
RSSSF
Greek SuperLeague official Site
SuperLeague Statistics

Alpha Ethniki seasons
Greece
1